The Albert Carlton Estate (also known as the Carlton-Underwood Estate) is a historic site in Wauchula, Florida, located at 302 East Bay Street. On October 3, 1991, it was added to the U.S. National Register of Historic Places. The Carlton House was built in 1885 by Albert and Martha (McEwen) Carlton. It was originally located in Hardee County, the house functioned as home to the Carltons and their ten children. Their eighth child, Doyle E. Carlton, who later became Florida's 25th governor from 1929 to 1933. It was later inhabited by William Albert Carlton, a 7th generation member of the pioneering Carlton family of Florida citrus growers and ranchers,  and his wife, Barbara.

References

 Hardee County listings at National Register of Historic Places
 Hardee County listings at Florida's Office of Cultural and Historical Programs

Houses in Hardee County, Florida
Houses on the National Register of Historic Places in Florida
National Register of Historic Places in Hardee County, Florida